Shelbyville High School is a public high school located in the unincorporated community of Shelbyville, Texas, USA and classified as a 2A school by the UIL.  It is a part of the Shelbyville Independent School District located in southeastern Shelby County.   In 2015, the school was rated "Met Standard" by the Texas Education Agency.

Athletics
The Shelbyville Grady Clays compete in these sports - 

Volleyball, Cross Country, Football, Basketball, Powerlifting, Track, Baseball & Softball

State Titles
Baseball 
1988(2A)
Boys Basketball 
1982(2A), 1984(2A) 2019(2A) 2020(2A)

References

External links
Shelbyville ISD website

Public high schools in Texas
Education in Shelby County, Texas